"Forgiveness" is a single by British indie rock band, Editors. The song is the thirdtrack and the fifth single off of their fifth studio album, In Dream, and was released as a single through PIAS Recordings on 31 March 2016.

Style 
Laurence Day, writing for The Line of Best Fit, described the song as a Gothic, dark pop song. Day described the tone of the track as "an overtly political glimpse into a murky corner of Editors' psyche, with hushed shoulder-shuffle beats and infectious, echoing riffs. It's glossy and catchy, shimmering out your speakers, but an omnipresent deluge of shadows looms large overhead - Editors continue to strike the perfect balance between light and dark."

Writing for XS Noise, Mark Millar called "Forgiveness" as a track that "amply demonstrates [a] desire to ignore genres by mixing a loose dancefloor beat with spiraling melodies and a highly politicized lyric."

Charts

References

External links 

2015 songs
2016 singles
Editors (band) songs
PIAS Recordings singles
Songs written by Edward Lay
Songs written by Russell Leetch
Songs written by Tom Smith (musician)
Songs written by Justin Lockey
Songs written by Elliott Williams